Tell It to the Marines is a British television sitcom that aired on ITV from 1959 to 1960. The series was based on the rivalry between the Marines and the Royal Navy. The series no longer exists.

Background
Jack Hylton, who had an exclusive contract to provide Associated-Rediffusion's entertainment programmes, was keen to mirror the success of Granada's sitcom The Army Game. Tell It to the Marines was created by Ted Willis, who had created the police drama Dixon of Dock Green, and the theme music by jazz musician Chris Barber. The series was not a success. Of the 30 episodes, Milo Lewis directed 29 and Tig Roe one.

Cast
Alan White – Leading Seaman White
Ronald Hines – Marine Corporal Surtees
Ian MacNaughton – Dalrymple 
Jack Allen – Major Howard
Henry McGee – Lt Raleigh
Ian Colin – Commander Walters
John Baskcomb – Petty Officer Woodward
Ian Whittaker – Whittle
Norman Chappell – Tubby

Plot
The series is based on the rivalry at both officer and lower ranks level between the Royal Navy and the Royal Marines when the latter are billeted with the former.

Episodes
Tell It to the Marines aired every week from September 1959 to April 1960 on Wednesdays, mostly at 7.00pm. Due to the archival policies of the time, all 30 episodes have been wiped and none are known to survive.

References

External links

1950s British sitcoms
1960s British sitcoms
1959 British television series debuts
1960 British television series endings
Black-and-white British television shows
English-language television shows
ITV sitcoms
Lost television shows